Qeshlaq-e Deh Ful (also Romanized as Qeshlāq-e Deh Fūl; also known as Gheslagh Dehfool, Qeshlāq-e Dehmūl, and Qeshlāq-e Dehpūl) is a village in Tariq ol Eslam Rural District, in the Central District of Nahavand County, Hamadan Province, Iran. At the 2006 census, its population was 117, in 24 families.

References 

Populated places in Nahavand County